The Bakrie Group is an Indonesian conglomerate founded by Achmad Bakrie in 1942. It has interests across various industries including mining, oil and gas, property development, infrastructure, plantations, media and telecommunications. The group is one of the largest business groups in Indonesia, with 10 companies listed on the Indonesia Stock Exchange.

It is headed by Nirwan Darmawan Bakrie and Indra Usmansyah Bakrie as co-chairpersons.

History
H. Achmad Bakrie founded Bakrie & Brothers ("N.V. Bakrie & Brothers") in 1942 in Telukbetung, South Sumatera. Bakrie & Brothers was established as a general trading and distribution company. In the 1950s Bakrie Group business activities have expanded to include general trading, construction services, agribusiness, coal mining, oil & gas, and telecommunications; while continuing to develop manufacturing such as steel pipes, building materials, and automotive components.

In 1986, Bakrie & Brothers acquired 75% shares of a local rubber plantation company PT. Uniroyal Sumatera Plantations (UNSP) then later changed the company name to PT. Bakrie Sumatera Plantations. In 1989, Bakrie & Brothers (BNBR) was listed in Jakarta Stock Exchange (now the Indonesia Stock Exchange).

Bakrie Group diversified into media and telecommunications business in the 1990s. A local TV station PT. Cakrawala Andalas Televisi (ANTV) was founded in 1992, and started to broadcast nationally a year later in 1993. In the same year Bakrie Group obtained the license to operate fixed wireless telecommunication and entered the telecommunications sector with PT. Bakrie Telecom.

In 2001 Bakrie Group entered gas and oil sector as PT. Energi Mega Persada (“ENRG”) a company focused on developing and exploring the upstream oil and gas in Indonesia was founded. Bakrie Group also acquired 80% of the coal mining company PT. Arutmin Indonesia (Arutmin) from BHP Minerals Exploration Inc, and PT Kaltim Prima Coal from (British Petroleum (BP) and Rio Tinto, in 2003.

In 2007, Forbes Asia estimated the Bakrie family had $5,4 billion in wealth, however after the 2008 financial crisis it dropped to only $850 million as Bakrie Group companies were heavily affected by the financial crisis.

In 2014, Bakrie Group through Bakrie Global Ventura made a US$25 million investment in a California-based private social network Path, a social networking-enabled photo sharing and messaging service for mobile devices. Path had the most users in Indonesia compared to any other countries with more than 4 million active users.

Bakrie Group has a limited partnership with Convergence Ventures, since its inception in 2015 the VC has backed 16 startups in Indonesia.

In 2019, Bakrie Group made an undisclosed investment in BumiLangit Studios, Indonesian character based entertainment company in Indonesia. The Investment was made by VIVA group who are currently focusing on developing Indonesia's own superhero cinematic universe through the library of the intellectual property rights of BumiLangit Studios. The first movie in line, Gundala released in August 2019 was a theater hit grossing 48,3 million Rupiah.

In 2020, due to the COVID-19 pandemic, Bakrie & Brothers of Bakrie Group furloughed 153 of its staff for at least 3 months. Additionally, the company also introduced salary reduction plans to 800 employees in their attempt to reduce financial burdens due to limited business activity.

Companies
Bakrie Group is made up of 10 individual companies without a controlling parent company. Each of the Bakrie companies has more subsidiaries involved in various Industry, Digital, Energy and Agricultural sectors.

Core members

Other members 

 PT. Bakrie Autoparts
 PT. Bakrie Metal Industries
 PT. Bakrie Pipe Industries
 PT. Bakrie Steel Industries
 PT. Bakrie Building Industries
 PT. Bakrie Indo Infrastructure
 PT. Bakrie Harper
 PT. Bakrie Energy International
 PT. Bakrie Construction 
 PT. Bakrie Gas
 PT. Cakrawala Andalas Televisi 
 PT. Lativi Media Karya
 PT. Bakrie Gasindo Utama
 PT. Bakrie Power
 PT. Bakrie Oil & Gas Infrastructure
 PT. Bakrie Telco Infrastructure
 PT. Bakrie Toll
 PT. Multi Kontrol Nusantara
 PT. Arutmin Indonesia
 PT. Kaltim Prima Coal
 PT. Bumi Resource Minerals
 PT. Bakrie Global Ventura

Related organizations 

 Bakrie Untuk Negeri
 Achmad Bakrie Foundation
 Bakrie Center Foundation
 Bakrie Amanah
 Bakrie University
 Yayasan Pendidikan Bakrie
 Freedom Institute
 BumiLangit Studio
 Convergence Ventures

Business sectors

Mining 
Bakrie Group operates in the mining sector, mainly focused in coal mining through PT. Bumi Resource (BUMI) and its subsidiaries PT. Bumi Resource Minerals (BMRS), PT. Arutmin Indonesia, PT. Kaltim Prima Coal, PT. Pendopo Energi Batubara, and PT. Fajar Bumi Sakti. In May 2020, Bakrie Capital Indonesia signed an agreement with Air Products (APD) to build a $2 billion coal-to-methanol manufacturing facility in East Kalimantan.

Oil and gas 
PT. Energi Mega Persada operates several oil and gas assets in Indonesia. In 2011 Energi Persada expanded its business to Buzi block in Mozambique, Africa through their subsidiary EMP Mining Overseas Pte. List of current operations;

 Bentu PSC, Riau
 Buzi EPCC, Mozambique
 Gebang PSC, North Sumatra 
 Kangean PSC, East Java
 Korinci Baru PSC, Riau
 Malacca Strait PSC, Sumatra
 Sangatta II CBM PSC, East Kalimantan
 Tonga PSC, Sumatra

Media and entertainment 
Bakrie Group owned PT Visi Media Asia Tbk (VIVA). The company activities covers Free to Air (FTA) TV networks with antv, tvOne, VTV and digital media portal viva.co.id.

Agribusiness 
Through PT. Bakrie Sumatra Plantations, Bakrie Group managed an estimated 100,000 ha of rubber and palm oil plantation in the island of Sumatra. Bakrie Sumatera Plantations Tbk (BSP) is a subsidiary of Bakrie Group.
BSP has extensive landbanks.

One of its directors is Bungaran Saragih, a former minister of agriculture.

It operates or used to operate on peatlands.

Infrastructure 
Through Bakrie & Brothers, Bakrie Group is involved in transportation, water, electricity, and industrial projects in Indonesia through several of its subsidiaries. Bakrie oversaw the development of Tanjung Jati A power station, a coal-fired power station in Central Java.

Sports team ownership

Basketball club

Pelita Jaya Bakrie (1987-present) 
Pelita Jaya Basketball Club was founded in 1987 by Bakrie Group. Pelita Jaya is a three time national basketball league champion. Currently the club management is led by Syailendra Bakrie and currently competing in Indonesian Basketball League (IBL).

Football club

Brisbane Roar (2012-present) 
Bakrie Group, through PT. Pelita Jaya Cronus acquired A-League title-holders Brisbane Roar FC in 2011. Bakrie Group initially purchased 70% of the club shares, but in 2012 the Football Federation Australia (FFA) announced that the Bakrie Group has acquired 100% ownership of A-League club Brisbane Roar FC. In May 2016, Brisbane Roar faced an administrative and financial turbulences when the team ownership held investment in the club, resulting in Brisbane Roar failure to pay staff and players.

C.S. Visé (2011-2014) 
C.S. Visé, a second division league Belgium football club was acquired by Bakrie Group in 2011, during Bakrie's ownership Indonesian youth players like Syamsir Alam, Manahati Lestusen and Alfin Tuasalamony were called to play for the club. C.S Vise was eventually sold by Bakrie Group in 2014.

References

 
Conglomerate companies of Indonesia
Companies based in Jakarta
Bakrie family
Conglomerate companies established in 1942
1942 establishments in the Dutch East Indies